Stigmella aeneofasciella is a moth of the family Nepticulidae. It is found in most of Europe, except the Iberian Peninsula and Balkan Peninsula and the Mediterranean islands.

The wingspan is 4.4-5.5 mm. The head is  black. Antennal eyecaps white. Forewings shining brass with a deep purple basal fascia, a shining silvery fascia beyond middle, preceded by a purple fascia, apical area beyond this deep purple. Hindwings grey.

Adults are on wing from April to May and again from July to August. There are two generations per year.

The larvae feed on Agrimonia eupatoria, Fragaria vesca, Potentilla anserina, Potentilla erecta and Potentilla reptans. They mine the leaves of their host plant. The first part of the mine is a long, slender corridor, rather straight, often following a vein or the leaf margin. At the end, the corridor widens into a large blotch.

References

External links
bladmineerders.nl
Swedish Moths
Stigmella aeneofasciella at UKMoths
Naturhistoriska riksmuseet
Fauna Europaea
Stigmella aeneofasciella images at  Consortium for the Barcode of Life

Nepticulidae
Moths of Europe
Moths described in 1855